The Västgöta Regiment, also I 6, was a Swedish Army infantry regiment that traced its origins back to the 16th century. It was converted from a cavalry regiment in 1811 and disbanded in 1927. The regiment's soldiers were recruited from the province of Västergötland, and it was later garrisoned there.

History 

The regiment was converted from the cavalry regiment Västergötland Dragoon Regiment in 1811 and was given the name Västgöta Regiment. The regiment was given the designation I 6 (6th Infantry Regiment) in a general order in 1816. It was garrisoned in Vänersborg from 1916, and disbanded in 1927.

Campaigns 

None

Organisation 

1833
Livkompaniet
Laske kompani
Älvsborgs kompani
Barne kompani
Kåkinds kompani
Vadsbo kompani
Gudhems kompani
Vartofta kompani

Commanding officers
Regimental commander from 1679 to 1927.

1679–1708: G Zelow
1708–1710: K Hierta
1710–1714: C G Dücker
1714–1719: Hans von Fersen
1719–1721: C Frölich
1721–1731: C G Kruse
1731–1737: A Spens
1737–1740: D J von Löwenstern
1740–1747: J F Didron
1747–1749: J F von Kaulbars
1749–1768: A Wrede-Sparre
1768–1775: L Hierta
1775–1785: Carl Julius Bernhard von Bohlen
1785–1808: G W Fock
1808–1811: M Palmstierna
1811–1824: G M Adlercreutz
1824–1842: U C C A von Platen
1842–1858: B Von Hall
1858–1868: E G Lilliehöök
1868–1872: E H Hagberg
1872–1887: M W Hamilton
1887–1896: C W Ericson
1896–1904: Axel von Matern
1904–1912: Erik Bergström
1912–1913: Anders Erik Werner
1913–1922: Hugo Leonard Leth
1922–1927: Ernst Nils David af Sandeberg

Names, designations and locations

See also
 List of Swedish infantry regiments

Footnotes

References

Notes

Print

Infantry regiments of the Swedish Army
Disbanded units and formations of Sweden
Military units and formations established in 1628
Military units and formations disestablished in 1927
1628 establishments in Sweden
1927 disestablishments in Sweden